Delta Tao Software is a small software developer and publisher focusing on games for Macintosh, though some of its more popular products have been ported to Windows, Linux, and other platforms.

History
Delta Tao was founded in 1990 by Joe Williams and Tim Cotter, who had developed Color MacCheese, a paint program notable for being the first to use 24-bit color and for its $49 price tag at a time when its nearest competitor, PixelPaint, was $399. Delta Tao hosted a booth at Mac World Boston in 1990, featuring Color MacCheese and Polly MacBeep. Its early products included several innovative graphics programs for Macintosh, including Zeus and Monet, but within a few years the company had shifted almost entirely to games, usually geared for network play.

Delta Tao uses minimalist software packaging, which has earned them recognition as an eco-friendly software company. A demo version of the company's Eric's Ultimate Solitaire program was shipped with each Macintosh at one point.

Products
Spaceward Ho!
Clan Lord
Eric's Ultimate Solitaire
Multiple Dark Castle derivatives.
Strategic Conquest
Eric's Cascade
Color MacCheese
Apprentice
Zeus
Monet
Polly MacBeep
WonderPrint

References

External links
 
 Delta Tao IGN profile

Software companies established in 1990
Macintosh software companies
Video game development companies
Video game publishers
Video game companies of the United States
Companies based in Sacramento County, California
1990 establishments in California